Bucculatrix yemenitica is a moth in the  family Bucculatricidae. It is found in Yemen. It was described in 1999 by Wolfram Mey.

References

Natural History Museum Lepidoptera generic names catalog

Bucculatricidae
Moths described in 1999
Moths of the Arabian Peninsula